Zapata "Zap" Espinoza (born March 12, 1960, in Hollywood, CA) is a journalist and current editor-in-chief of Road Bike Action Magazine a Hi-Torque Publication. He was formerly editor of two American mountain biking magazines, including Mountain Bike Magazine. Zapata was inducted into the Mountain Bike Hall of Fame in 1995.

He began his writing career working for LA Weekly in the early 1980s, writing on local politics. In 1985 he began working for Hi-Torque Publications writing for Motocross Action Magazine. He was the editor of Mountain Bike Action Magazine from 1986 to 1993, when he moved to Rodale's Mountain Bike magazine, until he was fired in 2004. From there, Espinoza became a brand manager for Trek Bicycle Corporation, where he worked until October 2006 until he left to return to Hi-Torque. He then got a job at Hi-Torque to work as a feature editor for Motocross Action Magazine, Mountain Bike Magazine, and Road Bike Action Magazine, becoming editor-in-chief of Road Bike Action Magazine in 2010.

He is best known for pushing motorcycle and cycling trends from gear, to riding styles, to fashion, to the loud, abrasive hubris of the scene, in mountain biking.

References

External links
 Mountain Bike Hall of Fame page

People from Hollywood, Los Angeles
American magazine editors
Mountain biking journalists
Living people
1960 births
20th-century American journalists
American male journalists